U-37 may refer to one of the following German submarines:

 , was a Type U 31 submarine launched in 1914 and that served in the First World War until sunk on 30 April 1915
 During the First World War, Germany also had these submarines with similar names:
 , a Type UB II submarine launched in 1915 and sunk on 14 January 1917
 , a Type UC II submarine launched in 1916 and surrendered in 1919
 , a Type IX submarine that served in the Second World War until scuttled on 8 May 1945

Submarines of Germany